Tijuca (meaning marsh or swamp in the Tupi language, from ty ("water") and îuk ("rotten")) is a neighbourhood of the Northern Zone of the city of Rio de Janeiro, Brazil. It comprises the region of Saens Peña and Afonso Pena squares. According to the 2000 Census, the district has close to 150,000 inhabitants. It borders with Praça da Bandeira, Maracanã, Vila Isabel, Andaraí, Grajaú and Alto da Boa Vista neighbourhoods.

It is one of the most traditional districts of Rio de Janeiro and has the third largest urban forest in the world, the Tijuca Forest, which is result of reforestation from coffee fields that led to lack of water at that time. Mainly a middle class district, it has been historically inhabited by Portuguese immigrant families and the families of military officers.

Tijuca hosts Salgueiro, Império da Tijuca and Unidos da Tijuca, three of the main Rio de Janeiro Samba Schools, that together have won 13 titles.

Tijuca is also home to many favelas such as Salgueiro, Borel, Formiga, Turano and Casa Branca.

Culture and entertainment 

Tijuca is also known for its vibrant cultural scene and entertainment options. The neighborhood has several theaters, cinemas, and music venues, as well as a wide range of restaurants, bars, and cafes. Tijuca's nightlife is particularly popular, with several clubs and music venues attracting both locals and tourists.

One of the most popular events in Tijuca is the Carnival parade, which takes place every year during the week leading up to Lent. The neighborhood's samba schools participate in the parade, showcasing their elaborate costumes and dance routines. Tijuca's Carnival parade is known for its lively atmosphere and is one of the most popular events in Rio de Janeiro's Carnival celebrations.

Saens Peña Square
Praça Saens Peña (Saens Peña Square) is a public square located in the Tijuca. The square was named after the Brazilian physician and scientist Adolpho Lutz, who adopted the pseudonym "Saens Peña" in honor of Argentine President Roque Sáenz Peña. The square was inaugurated in 1911, and it quickly became a popular gathering place for locals. In the early years, the square was known for its elegant gardens, which were designed by the renowned Brazilian landscape architect Roberto Burle Marx. Over time, Praça Saens Peña became an important commercial center, with numerous shops, restaurants, and businesses opening in the surrounding area.

Sports 

Tijuca is a popular destination for sports enthusiasts, with several parks, gyms, and sports facilities located throughout the neighborhood. The Maracanã Stadium is particularly popular, hosting several soccer matches throughout the year, including matches featuring Rio de Janeiro's two largest soccer teams, Flamengo and Fluminense.

Tijuca is also home to several hiking trails and outdoor activities, including rock climbing and hang gliding. The Tijuca Forest offers several hiking trails, including one that leads to the summit of Pico da Tijuca, the highest point in the city.

Infrastructure 

Tijuca has a well-developed infrastructure, with several hospitals, schools, and shopping centers located throughout the neighborhood. Some of the most notable hospitals in Tijuca include the Hospital São Vicente de Paulo, Hospital Universitário Pedro Ernesto, and Hospital Federal do Andaraí.

Tijuca also has several shopping centers, including the Shopping Tijuca, which is one of the largest shopping malls in the city. The mall has over 200 stores, a cinema, and a food court, making it a popular destination for shoppers.

Transportation 

Tijuca is well-connected to the rest of Rio de Janeiro through several public transportation options, including buses and the metro. The neighborhood is also served by several major highways, making it easily accessible by car.

References 

Neighbourhoods in Rio de Janeiro (city)